The Journal of General Internal Medicine is a monthly peer-reviewed medical journal established in 1986 and covering internal medicine. It is published by Springer Nature and is the official journal of the Society of General Internal Medicine. According to the Journal Citation Reports, the journal has a 2020 impact factor of 5.128. It is an official journal of the Society of General Internal Medicine.

Editors-in-chief

The following persons have been editors-in-chief of the journal::
 1986-1989  Robert H, Fletcher & Suzanne W. Fletcher
 1990-1994  David C. Dale
 1995-1999  Sankey V. Williams
 2000-2004  Eric Bass
 2004-2009  William Tierney & Martha Gerrity
 2009-2017  Richard Kravitz & Mitch Feldman
The current (2017-2022) editors-in-chief are Steve Asch (Stanford University), Carol Bates (Harvard University), and Jeffrey Jackson (Medical College of Wisconsin).

References

External links 

 

Publications established in 1986
Internal medicine journals
English-language journals
Springer Science+Business Media academic journals
Monthly journals